Vasant Purushottam Kale, popularly known as Va Pu, was a Marathi writer. He wrote more than 60 books. His well-known works include Partner, Vapurza, Hi Waat Ekatichi, and Thikri. He was a famous story-teller and had over 1600 stage-shows (कथाकथन) in the theatres. He was the first writer to come in form of audio cassettes.

He has also written so many story collection books which include "Sakhi" , "Taptapadi" , "One for the road" etc. which are praised by the readers for being relatable.

Kale was an architect by profession.

He died of heart failure on 26 June 2001 at his home in Mumbai.

Short stories

Aik sakhe
Amitabh ani me
Apan Saare Arjun
Badali
Bai Bayako Aani Calendar
Bhade
Bhul Bhulyia
Chaturbhuj
Chakkar
Dost
Donde
Duniya Tula Visrel - Lecture on Wasudev Waman Patankar
Ekmek
Fantasy Ek Preyasy
Gheneration GAP
Ghar Harawaleli Manse
Goshta hatatali hoti
Goph
Gulmohar
Hi Waat Ekatichi 
Hunkar
Intimate
J K Malvankar
Karmachari
Ka Re Bhulalasi
Kahi Khara Kahi Khota
Katha-kathanachi katha
Lombkalnari Maanasa
Mahotsav
Manus
Mayabazar
Maza mazyapashi
Mi manus shodhtoy
Moden pan vaknar nahi
Nimitta
Navara Mhanava Aapala
One for the road
Partner
Pleasure Box
Panpoi
Prem mai
partner
Ranga Manache
Rang Panchami
Sakhi
Sanvadini
Swar
Thikari
Taptapadi
Too bhramat aahaasi waayaa
Va Pu Sange Vadilanchi Kirti
Valay
Vapurvai
Vapurza (a compilation of passages from his earlier work)
Va pu 85
Zopala
Rutu Basanti Rooth Gayee

References

Marathi-language writers
Marathi people
1933 births
2001 deaths
20th-century Indian short story writers
Writers from Maharashtra